The Mark 12 5"/38 caliber gun was a United States dual-purpose naval gun, but also installed in single-purpose mounts on a handful of ships. The 38 caliber barrel was a mid-length compromise between the previous United States standard 5"/51 low-angle gun and 5"/25 anti-aircraft gun. United States naval gun terminology indicates the gun fired a projectile  in diameter, and the barrel was 38 calibers long. The increased barrel length provided greatly improved performance in both anti-aircraft and anti-surface roles compared to the 5"/25 gun. However, except for the barrel length and the use of semi-fixed ammunition, the 5"/38 gun was derived from the 5"/25 gun. Both weapons had power ramming, which enabled rapid fire at high angles against aircraft.

Among naval historians, the 5"/38 gun is considered the best intermediate-caliber, dual purpose naval gun of World War II, especially as it was usually under the control of the advanced Mark 37 Gun Fire Control System which provided accurate and timely firing against surface and air targets. Even this advanced system required nearly 1000 rounds of ammunition expenditure per aircraft kill. However, the planes were normally killed by shell fragments and not direct hits; barrage fire was used, with many guns firing in the air at the same time. This would result in large walls of shell fragments being put up to take out one or several planes or in anticipation of an unseen plane, this being justifiable as one plane was capable of significant destruction. The comparatively high rate of fire for a gun of its caliber earned it an enviable reputation, particularly as an anti-aircraft weapon, in which role it was commonly employed by United States Navy vessels. Base ring mounts with integral hoists had a nominal rate of fire of 15 rounds per minute per barrel; however, with a well-trained crew, 22 rounds per minute per barrel was possible for short periods. On pedestal and other mounts lacking integral hoists, 12 to 15 rounds per minute was the rate of fire. Useful life expectancy was 4600 effective full charges (EFC) per barrel.

The 5"/38 cal gun was mounted on a very large number of US Navy ships in the World War II era. It was backfitted to many of the World War I-era battleships during their wartime refits, usually replacing 5"/25 guns that were fitted in the 1930s. It has left active US Navy service, but it is still on mothballed ships of the United States Navy reserve fleets. It is also used by a number of nations who bought or were given US Navy surplus ships. Millions of rounds of ammunition were produced for these guns, with over 720,000 rounds still remaining in Navy storage depots in the mid-1980s because of the large number of Reserve Fleet ships with 5"/38 cal guns on board.

Mark 12 5"/38 cal gun assembly

Each mount carries one or two Mk 12 5"/38cal Gun Assemblies. The gun assembly shown is used in single mounts, and it is the right gun in twin mounts. It is loaded from the left side. The left gun in twin mounts is the mirror image of the right gun, and it is loaded from the right side. The Mk12 gun assembly weighs . The Mark 12 Gun Assembly was introduced in 1934, where it was first used in single pedestal mounts on the s, but by the time of World War II they had been installed in single and twin mounts on nearly every major warship and auxiliary in the US fleet.

Characteristics
The major Mk12 Gun Assembly characteristics are:

Semi-automatic
During recoil, some of the recoil energy is stored in the counter-recoil system. That stored energy is used during counter-recoil to prepare the gun for the next round. The firing pin is cocked, the breech is opened, the spent propellant case is ejected, and the bore is cleared of debris with an air blast.

Hand loaded
A projectile-man and a powder-man are stationed at each gun assembly. Their job is to move the round, consisting of a projectile and a propellant case, from the hoists to the rammer tray projecting from the gun's breech, and then start the ram cycle. The powder case is placed first and the projectile rests against the powder case.

Power rammed
The rammer's control box, hydraulic fluid tank and AC motor are bolted to the top of the slide (see the Gun Assembly picture above). The hydraulically driven rammer spade, called the power spade in that picture, is at the back of the rammer tray. If the multiple names of the "spade" are confusing, look at this footnote. Hand ramming was also possible in case of power failures with rate of fire approximately cut in half.

Vertical sliding-wedge breech block (see drawing)
The breech block closes the chamber behind the propellant case. It also contains the firing pin assembly.

Hydraulic recoil
Two hydraulic pistons in the housing absorb the major shock of recoil as the housing moves back inside the slide (see picture). They also buffer the end of counter-recoil for a soft return to battery.

Pneumatic counter-recoil
At the end of recoil, the counter-recoil system moves the housing forward again until it is back "in battery," and holds it there at any gun elevation. A chamber in the housing is filled with compressed air. At the rear of this chamber is a  cylindrical hole with a chevron packing. Projecting through the hole is a movable piston that abuts the back of the slide (see picture). The air pressure in the chamber attempts to push the piston out of the chamber, but the piston can't move because of the slide. Therefore, since the piston can't go backwards, the air pressure in the chamber forces the housing forward.

Barrel designation (5"/38 Caliber)
 5" is the caliber of this gun. The term "caliber" used here is the artillery caliber definition, and its value is equal to the bore diameter as measured from land to land. Lands are the raised portions of the bore rifling, between the grooves. (note: artillery caliber and small arms caliber are not the same).
 38 caliber means that the barrel from breech face to muzzle is 38 calibers in length. As this gun's caliber is 5 inches (127mm), its barrel length is 38 times 5 inches: .

Barrel description 
 Radially expanded monobloc steel alloy.
 Weight: 
 The bore is chrome plated from the origin of rifling (forward end of the chamber) to the muzzle.
 45 groove rifling with a full uniform right hand twist in 30 Calibers.
 Maximum bore pressure of a new gun firing an anti-aircraft common projectile: . 
 Barrel connected to the housing with a bayonet joint that allowed for its replacement by destroyer tenders in the theater of operation, without dismantling the breech mechanism or other parts.

Armor penetration with  special common shell
5.0" (127 mm) belt armor at 
4.0" (102 mm) at 
3.0" (76 mm) at 
2.0" (51 mm) at 
1.0" (25 mm) deck armor at 
with  AA common shell:  at 

Range with  AAC Mark 49 (792 mps)
10° 
15° 
20° 
25° 
30° 
35° 
40° 
45° 
AA Ceiling 

US ships during World War II carried only small quantities of special common ammunition, as the anti-aircraft common was considered more useful, even if it meant achieving much less armor penetration. Bursting charges were  explosive D composition A, the special common had only 0.9-1.2 kg due to its thicker walls (AP).

Loading
At the "LOAD" command, or if the mount is executing "RAPID" loading: (NOTE: Rapid loading means that, when the gun fires, the gun crew immediately reloads the gun without command until "CEASE FIRE" or "CHECK FIRE" is given.)

The Powder-Man:
 Verifies that the RAMMER SPADE is at the rear of the "Rammer Tray" (see picture)
 Slips the "Butterfly" primer protector off the base of the powder case that is sticking knee high out of powder hoist on the deck.
 Throws the protector out of the mount.
 Pulls the powder case out of the hoist, and lifts it into the rammer tray.
 Verifies that the case is back against the rammer spade.
 Clears his arms from the tray.
The Projectile-Man:
 Verifies that the powder case is in the rammer tray.
 Pulls the projectile out of the waist high projectile hoist.
 Places projectile in front of the powder case in the tray.
 Clears his arms from the tray.
 Pulls down on the RAMMER CONTROL (see RAMMER CONTROL at the upper left corner of picture).
Rammer Load Cycle:
 Pulling down on the Rammer Control lever opens hydraulic valves inside the Rammer Controller.
 The opened valves port high pressure hydraulic fluid to the "Hydraulic Ram Cylinder" in the Slide behind the tray. The Ram Cylinder is connected to the "Rammer Cross Head". (The white horizontal bar behind the Spade in the picture.) The Cross Head supports the Rammer Spade as it moves in the tray. When the cylinder is pressurized, the Cross Head and Spade are driven forward in the Tray.
 As the spade moves forward, it pushes the projectile and powder case into the chamber. The spade's time of travel, from the rear of the tray to the breech, is one second. As it approaches the breech, the Cross Head pushes through a spring latch that locks it there. At the same time, the Cross Head trips another lever connected to the Rammer Controller, and the Controller releases the hydraulic pressure to the Ram Cylinder.
 When the powder case clears the top of the breech block, the block automatically rises.
 The rising breech block displaces the rammer spade behind the powder case by pushing the spring-loaded spade up. This continues until the rammer spade is off the powder case, and the block has sealed the chamber.
 The gun is loaded and ready to fire.

Firing
This gun can be fired either electrically or by percussion.

When the gun fires, the following automatic events happen in two seconds:
 During Recoil:
 The Rammer Crosshead is unlocked.
 The Rammer Control is pushed to the up position by a cam on top of the rearward moving Housing.
 With the Rammer Control up, the Rammer Controller ports high pressure hydraulic fluid to the retract side of the Rammer Cylinder, and the Rammer Crosshead and Spade drive back to the rear of the Rammer Tray.
 During Counter-recoil:
 The Firing Pin is cocked.
 The Breech Block is lowered.
 The spent Powder Case is ejected out of the Chamber, and back down the Rammer Tray. There it is caught by the gloved Hot Case Man, and thrown out of the mount.
 Just before the housing finishes returning to "In Battery", a valve is opened for a second, and a blast of compressed air is sent down the bore to clean it out.
The gun is ready to be reloaded.

Gun mounts

Types
     There are four basic mount types:

Twin 
 All sat on a base ring stand, and had an ammunition handling room, called the Upper Handling Room (as it was above the main magazine), below the mount.
 They all had:
 Horizontal periscopic sights with movable-prism sight setting.
 Two powered, fuze setting, projectile hoists.
 Two powered powder case hoists.
 Powered training and elevating drives (in this context, "training" means rotating the mount on its stand).
 This mount was the standard installation on battleships, cruisers, early destroyer leader classes (these mounts on the DL's were single-purpose/anti-surface ship only), and later destroyers (starting with the ). It was also used on the island (starboard) side of the s.

Enclosed single
All enclosed single mounts sat on a base ring stand, and had an upper handling room.

Open single base ring mount
Open mount with Upper-Handling Room. Used on the port and starboard gangways, just below the flight deck, on s and  through  destroyers.

Open single pedestal mount
This was the first 5"/38cal type installed. Some of these mounts placed on ship's forecastles were partially enclosed to protect the crew against bow spray, but they were still considered an open mount. Since these mounts did not have Upper Handling Rooms, they could be installed on ships without extensive reconstruction. For that reason, they were frequently used on armed merchant ships.

Farragut and Mahan had only open mounts. The Gridley class introduced the enclosed single gun house, but not all of its guns were enclosed. The Benham class replaced all pedestal mounts with open base ring mounts later on. The Fletcher class was the first to only have enclosed guns (except for the Porter and Somers destroyer leaders).

There are several models of the 5"/38, differentiated by the word Mark (or its abbreviation MK) and a number. Variations to the basic design are called Modifications (or its abbreviation Mod). For instance, 5"/38 MK 21 is a single-barrel open pedestal mount widely used on amphibious ships, auxiliaries, and merchant ships. The 5"/38 MK 30 is a single enclosed base ring mount widely used on destroyer escorts. The 5"/38 MK 38 is a twin mount specifically designed for newer destroyers.

Ammunition delivery
Since this gun fires semi-fixed ammunition, each round is delivered to the gun in two piecesa projectile and a powder case.

Base ring mounts
The ready service ammunition is kept in the upper handling room just below the mount. The projectile travels up to the gun room (also called the gun house) through an electric-hydraulic hoist. It arrives next to the projectile-man nose down and waist high. If the projectile has a time fuze, the fuze is automatically set as it goes up the hoist, and the hoist maintains the ordered fuze setting from the fire control system as long as the projectile stays in the hoist. The powder case is sent up through a powder scuttle in the gun room's deck just next to the powder man's feet. It arrives with its base up, and the primer covered with a protector called the "Butterfly". The men in the upper handling room hand carry the projectiles and powder cases from the ready service racks to the lower ends of the hoists while avoiding the equipment hanging down from the rotating mount. In a twin mount executing "Rapid continuous fire" (the firing keys are held closed, and the gun fires as soon as the breech closes), the crew move 30 to 44 projectiles and powder cases per minute.

Pedestal mounts
The ready service ammunition is kept in lockers or compartments arrayed around the mount. The projectiles and powder cases are hand carried from ready service to the left side of the moving mount. The projectile is placed nose down in one of three Fuze Setter Mechanisms (commonly called fuze pots) on the mount. If the man is delivering a projectile with a mechanical time fuze, he then spins a hand crank just in front of that fuze setter mechanism. This would dial in the ordered fuze time into that projectile. The powder case is placed in a rack bolted to the mount's deck just behind the powder-man's feet.

Mount crew
Depending on the mount, a 5"/38 caliber gun could have a crew of 15 to 27 personnel in the gun room and upper handling room. This does not include the personnel needed in the magazines during extended actions. There were two modes of mount operation that the crew was trained and expected to know. The primary mode was "automatic control", where the mount was slaved to the fire control system. But if the fire control system was damaged, or if the ship's power was out; the mount could continue the action in "local control". In US service, most gun crews were US Navy personnel. Even the civilian Merchant Marine ships had a small detachment of the Navy Armed Guard on board to operate the 5"/38 and other guns. One exception to this was on ships with a Marine Detachment, where the Marines manned one of the mounts, usually decorated with the Marine emblem (see the USMC emblem on USS New Jersey's Mk 28, Mod 2 mount picture above).

Mount captain
A senior Petty Officer or Gunnery Sergeant who was in command of the mount. In enclosed mounts, he stood on an interior platform that was located half way up the back bulkhead of the enclosure. There was a hatch on the top of the enclosure where he could stick his head and shoulders out the mount's top. On some mounts, this hatch had a steel hood welded around the back and sides (see an example of this hood in the USS New Jersey picture). This hood protected the Mount Captain from the muzzle blasts of adjacent weapons. He was wearing a sound powered telephone so that he could receive action orders from the battery commander, and send mount status reports back. Covering the telephone headset, there is a helmet specially designed to fit over the phone. Around his neck, he has a pair of gunnery binoculars which had a reticle scaled in angular mils. By ducking his head down into the mount, he could see the entire interior of the mount from his platform. Next to him was a voice tube down to the upper handling room. At arms length, he had switches for controlling communication, emergency lighting, and battle lanterns. His duties during Automatic Control was to receive action orders from the battery commander (e.g.: "Mount 51, plot. Surface action starboard. Target destroyer. Bearing 060. Range nine thousand, five hundred yards. Slow salvo."), give the appropriate orders to his Gun Room and Upper Handling Room crews (e.g.: "Match pointers. Switch to automatic. Handling room fill the hoists with able able common and full service charge. Standby for slow salvo."), verify that his orders were being followed, and report his gun's status back to the battery commander (e.g: "Plot, mount 51 in auto. Bore clear."). In Local Control, he aims and fires his mount's gun(s)sometimes without external help. With his gunnery binoculars, he estimates the range to the target, and its bearing rate. He then mentally converts these into range and deflection orders to his Sight Setter. After firing, he observes the fall of his shot, and makes sight corrections to his Sight Setter if necessary.

Gun Captain
The Gunner's Mate(s) responsible for maintaining the mount. Daily, he goes through a process of checking fluid levels, lubricating bearings, cleaning gun sights, cycling powered equipment, testing firing systems, checking gas pressures, and verifying that all the equipment that will be needed in an action is in his mount. In twin mounts, there will be a gun captain assigned to each gun assembly. The gun captain usually stands on his foot high tool box welded to the mount's deck, and offset from the gun's centerline (see the man in black standing on the box in the MK21 open mount picture). This places him high and aft of the rammer motor. From there, he can watch the actions of the powder-man, projectile-man, breech block, and rammer. He can verify that the gun returns to battery before the next round is loaded. If something goes wrong, he is free to move around his gun to fix the problem. He knows everybody's job, and can step in if necessary. At the mount captain's command, he manually opens the breech block before the first round is loaded, and reports if the bore is clear. His duties are the same in automatic or local control.

Pointer
 Controls the mount's elevation and firing. He sits in the left front corner of the mount. In front of him, are his optical sight, hand wheels, and elevation drive controls. To his right, about elbow high, is a large box called the Elevation Indicator Regulator. (pictured) This box controls the elevation power drive. Through a window on top of the box, he sees a set of dials that indicate the elevation of the gun, and the automatic elevation orders coming from the Fire Control System. Above the Indicator Regulator is the Electrical Fire Select Switch. It is a rotary switch with three positions: Off, Local, and Auto. Off disables the electrical firing system on the mount. Local enables the electric firing key on his right hand wheel. Auto enables the off mount electrical firing circuit from the Fire Control System. Just outside his right knee, is the Percussion Select Lever. This mechanical lever has two positions: Safe, and Armed. When it is in the armed position, the mechanical linkage for percussion firing is enabled. His right footrest is at one end of this linkage, and the firing pin sear in the breech block is at the other. By rocking his right foot forward, he fires the gun. Electrical firing is the primary firing method. When the Mount Captain commands, "Match pointers. Switch to Automatic.", he looks down at the dials on his Indicator-Regulator. The dials tell him the difference between the gun's present elevation and the ordered elevation electrically coming from the Fire Control System by synchro. He changes the elevation of the gun, by moving his hand wheels, until the dial difference is zero. His dials are now "matched", and he switches the elevation drive into Auto. This disengages his hand wheels, and gives elevation control to the Fire Control System. Then, he moves the Electrical Fire Select Switch to "AUTO", and reports back to the Mount Captain, "Elevation in auto." He may now look through his sight, and if the Sight Setter has matched the sight-setter dial pointers, he will see the target in the cross-hairs. When the Mount Captain commands, "Switch to Local", he switches the elevation drive and the Electrical Fire Select Switch to local. In local control, he controls the gun's elevation with his hand wheels to keep his sight's horizontal cross hair on the target. At the command of the Mount Captain, he fires the gun by squeezing the firing key on his right hand wheel.

Trainer
Controls the mount's train angle (bearing). He sits in the right front corner of the mount (see the far right man in the Mk21 open mount picture). In front of him, are his optical sight, hand wheels, and train drive controls. Between his knees is a large box called the Train Indicator Regulator. (pictured) This box controls the train power drive. On top of the box, is a window with a set of dials that indicate the train angle of the gun, and the automatic train orders electrically coming from the Fire Control System by synchro. When the Mount Captain commands, "Match pointers. Switch to Automatic.", he looks down at the dials on his Indicator-Regulator. The dials also tell him the difference between the gun's present train angle and the ordered train angle. He changes the bearing of the gun, by moving his hand wheels, until the dial difference is zero. His dials are now "matched", and he switches the train drive into Auto. This disengages his hand wheels, and gives train angle control to the Fire Control System. Then, he reports back to the Mount Captain, "Train in auto." He may now look through his sight, and if the Sight Setter has matched the sight-setter dial pointers, he will see the target in the cross-hairs. When the Mount Captain commands, "Switch to Local", he switches the train drive to local. In local control, he controls the gun's train angle with his hand wheels to keep his sight's vertical cross hair on the target.

Sight setter
 Operates the sight setting equipment. In single mounts, he stands just behind the trainer (see the man with headphones in the Mk21 open mount picture), while in twin mounts he sits between the guns, just forward of the projectile hoists. The sight setter moves the sights' reticles relative to the barrel's axis. In early open mounts, this was done by moving the platforms to which the sights were bolted. Sights in enclosed mounts have movable prisms in their optical paths. The sight setter has three dials, and two hand cranks. (pictured) The two right dials and right hand crank control the elevation reticle offset (called Sight Angle). The upper right dial is scaled in minutes of arc, and the lower right dial is in yards. The left dial and hand crank control the reticle's left and right offset (called Sight Deflection), and the dial is scaled in angular mils. When the mount is in Automatic Control, he turns his hand cranks to keep index marks on his dials matched to lines on the central disks of the dials. These disks are electrically controlled by the Fire Control System by synchro. This is called matching the pointers, and it allows the sights to remain on the target while the mount is controlled by the Fire Control System. In local control, he takes sighting orders from the Mount Captain in yards of range and mils of deflection.

Fuze setter
He operates the equipment which sets the fuze time on projectiles with mechanical time fuzes. On a single enclosed mount, he sits below and just outboard of the Pointer's seat. Under the Pointer's seat, and in front the Fuse Setter, is the Fuse Indicator Regulator. (pictured) It is a box with a window, a hand crank, and a selector lever. On a twin mount, he and his Fuze Indicator Regulator sit next to the Sight Setter between the guns. When the mount is put in Automatic control, he flips the selector lever to Auto, and this electrically powered Fuze Indicator Regulator automatically follows the fuze setting orders sent from the Fire Control System by synchro. In Local Control, he follows the Mount Captain's fuze orders by spinning the hand crank until the dials in the window read the correct fuze time.

Powder-man
Slides the primer protector off the powder case, and then lifts the case from the powder scuttle at his feet to the gun's rammer tray.

Projectile-man
Moves the projectile from the hoist to the rammer tray in front of the just-placed powder case, and then he pulls the rammer lever to load the projectile and powder case into the chamber.

Hot case man
When the gun fires, he catches the ejected powder case and throws it out of the mount.

Check sight
He verifies that the mount is aiming at the target.

Ammunition

This gun uses semi-fixed ammunition. (Pictured) (Also called Separated Ammunition.) Each round consists of a projectile and a powder case. The two parts of the round are kept separate until they get to the gun. At the gun, they are first combined on the rammer tray, and then power rammed into the chamber together with one ram cycle. The powder case completely fills the volume of the chamber, and its length seats the projectile's rotating band into the bore's rifling. This is different from a naval bag gun. In a bag gun: (1) The projectile, by itself, is power rammed into the chamber until its rotating band is seated in the bore's rifling. (2) The rammer is retracted. (3) The powder bags are then rammed in. This is also different from some artillery field guns: (1) The projectile is hand rammed into the chamber with a ramrod until its rotating band is seated in the bore's rifling. (2) The ramrod is retracted. (3) Next powder is placed in the chamber either as a bag or primed canister with the required charge. Note that the single ram operation used in semi-fixed guns decreases the loading time, and therefore increases the firing rate on medium and large caliber guns. For example, each of the nine 8"(203 mm)/55 caliber Rapid-Fire guns installed on the  used auto-loaded semi-fixed ammunition and had a firing rate of 10 to 12 rounds a minute. See also the 8"/55 caliber Mark 71 gun.

Projectile

The Projectile (pictured) has three major parts: the body, the fuze, and the explosive charge.

Projectile body
The body is basically a machined steel tube with an ogive shape at one end. At the ogive and rear ends are threaded openings used to the install the shell's filler and hold the fuzes. Around the tube near the base is a copper alloy ring called the Rotating Band. This band has a diameter larger than the bore, and when the projectile and powder case are rammed into the chamber, the band is jammed into the grooves of the bore's rifling. It forms a gas seal between the projectile and the bore. Also, as the projectile travels down the barrel, the band grips the rifling to impart spin to the projectile.

Fuze
The Fuse detonates the projectile to cause maximum damage to the target. Different targets required different fuzes. The safety requirements of a fuze are that... 
 ... it is safe to handle. (i.e.: It will not arm if dropped, rolled, or shaken.) 
 ... it remains unarmed in the bore, and until the projectile is well clear of the firing ship to protect exposed personnel.  Therefore, when the gun is fired, the following events take place:
 14,000g acceleration  from the burning propellant in the bore. This acceleration is used to setback (i.e.: Force to the rear.)  some fuze parts from unarmed to armed positions due to their inertia.
 Centrifugal force from the 12,360 rpm  projectile rotation. This force causes other parts to move outward.
 7.2g deceleration  from aerodynamic drag after the projectile leaves the muzzle. Due to inertia, other movable parts will creep  forward.
All of these events must take place in the correct order to arm the fuze.

List of fuze types:
Mechanical time fuze
A nose time fuze that detonates the shell after an adjustable time interval has elapsed since firing.
Base detonating fuze
A base impact fuze screwed into the rear of a projectile to protect the fuze during impact. It delays the shell's detonation about 25 ms after impact, allowing the projectile to penetrate the target prior to detonation.
Point detonating fuze
A nose impact fuze. Very fast detonation on the surface of the target.
VT fuze
The VT (Variable Time, this is a counter-espionage decoy designation) fuze is a proximity fuze. It is a nose electronic fuze that does not require impact to trigger.  Designed to detonate close to the target. It was originally intended to be used against air targets. Now it is also used in shore bombardment and surface actions against fast boats. This is because the VT fuze has proved well suited for bursting the shell at the correct distance above the ground or water for maximum damage to lightly armored targets over a large area.
Auxiliary detonating fuze
In the projectile drawing, an Auxiliary Detonating Fuze is screwed onto the bottom of the Mechanical Time Fuze. This is because the time fuze primer does not have enough explosive shock to detonate the relatively insensitive Explosive "D". The Auxiliary fuze uses an intermediate explosive that is set off by the time fuze primer, and in turn, sets off the Explosive "D".

Powder case
The powder case is a brass or steel alloy cylinder closed at one end. It holds the propelling charge and a case combination primer. The charge is held packed around the primer by a wad, distance piece (not in clearing charge), and plug. When rammed in the chamber with the projectile, the Full and Reduced charge cases are designed to completely fill the volume of the chamber from the breechblock face to the base of the projectile when its rotating band is jammed into the bore's rifling. In other words, the powder case acts a rammer extension for the projectile. There are three types of powder cases:

Full service charge (pictured)
A 26.7 inch (679 mm) long, 12.3 pound (5.6 kg) brass case with 15.5 pounds (7.0 kg) of smokeless or flashless (used at night) powder. It is used in surface and anti-aircraft actions.
Reduced charge
The Reduced Charge uses the same case as the Full Service Charge, but with only  of powder and a longer distance piece. It is used in shore bombardment to lob shells, like a mortar, over obstacles to hit targets on the opposite side, and for propelling star shells at a lower velocity to protect the parachute from being shredded while it is deployed.
Clearing charge (Pictured)

The clearing charge (also called, "the short round") is a short case; plugged just above the wad. The distance piece between the wad and plug is left out. Its powder charge is less than a full service charge. This case is essential for the safety of the mount because it is needed to clear a gun after a misfire. Due to its importance, it is kept in a special container in the mount whenever the ship is in a combat zone. A misfire is especially dangerous in semi-fixed guns. When the breech is opened after the misfire, the faulty powder case can be extracted, but the projectile will remain jammed in the rifling. Also, all or part of the extracted case's cork plug may still be wedged in the chamber behind the projectile. This "fouls" the chamber because it decreases the chamber's volume. And, since Full and Reduced charge cases take up the full volume of an unfouled chamber (see loaded Semi-Fixed round drawing above), any residue left from the previously extracted case will prevent them from fully loading into the chamber. Therefore, the clearing charge is made short so that it will fit into a fouled chamber.

After hand extracting the bad case from the chamber, the clearing charge is removed from its special container and is hand rammed into the chamber. With the clearing charge sealed in the chamber, the projectile is fired out the muzzle. It is important to clear the projectile through the muzzle because it is not easy nor safe pushing a bore rod down the barrel to force a fuzed projectile back through the chamber and into the gun house. Also, if the gun has fired a number of rounds just prior to the misfire, time is critical because the barrel may be hot enough to cook off the high explosive in the projectile. This would destroy the mount.

Deployment

(to be moved to a suitable page)

Aircraft carriers

 3  8
  8
 24  12

Escort Carriers

 50  1
 19  2

Battleships

 2  20
 3 of 4  20
  16
 4  20

Heavy cruisers

  8
 14  12
 3  12
 3  12

Light cruisers

 2  8
 4  16
 4 Atlanta (Oakland) 12
 27  12
 2  12
 3  12

Destroyers

 8  5
 8  8
 18  5
 4  4
 8  4
 5  8
 10  4
 12  5
 6  5
 24 repeat-Bensons 4
 18  5
 48 repeat-Gleaves 4
 175  5
 58  6
 12  6
 98  6

Destroyer escorts

 22  2
 50 Rudderow-APDs 1
 83  2
 6  (launched as APDs) 1

Attack Transports

 7 of 328 Type C2 ship
 3  2
 4  2

Attack Cargo

 74 of 328 Type C2 ship
  1
 11  1
 32  1
 30  1

See also
 List of naval guns
 List of naval anti-aircraft guns
 Naval gunfire

Weapons of comparable role, performance and era
 QF 4.7 inch Mark XI gun : British equivalent dual-purpose gun.
 QF 4.5 inch Mk I – V naval gun : British equivalent dual-purpose gun.
 12.7 cm SK C/34 naval gun : German equivalent limited to low-angle fire.
 12.8 cm FlaK 40 : Dedicated anti-aircraft, land-based German gun of equal calibre.
 130 mm/50 B13 Pattern 1936 : Soviet equivalent naval and coastal gun.
 Canon de 138 mm Modèle 1929 : French equivalent naval gun.
 120 mm naval gun : Italian equivalent naval gun.
 12.7 cm/50 Type 3 naval gun : Japanese equivalent naval gun mounted on most destroyers and competitive against surface targets
 10 cm/65 Type 98 naval gun: Japanese naval gun mounted on  destroyers, aircraft carrier  and light cruiser , competitive in the anti-aircraft role

Weapons of comparable role in successive U.S. Navy service
 5"/54 caliber Mark 16 gun : 1945
 5"/54 caliber Mark 42 gun : 1953
 5"/54 caliber Mark 45 gun : 1971

Notes

External links

 Detailed description and history 5"/38 including ammunition and Mark data
 Illustrated descriptions of MK 30 & MK 38, list of ammunition for all Marks
 Illustrated description of MK 38
 Illustrated Operating Instructions for MK XXI model
 Photos of 5"/38 ammunition
 Naval Ordnance and Gunnery, 1957 Volume 1 Naval Ordnance NavPers 10797-A

 

5 inch
World War II naval weapons
Naval guns of the United States
127 mm artillery
Military equipment introduced in the 1930s